Poriol is a C-methylated flavanone, a type of flavonoid. It is found in Pseudotsuga menziesii (Douglas fir) in reaction to infection by Poria weirii.

References

Flavanones
Resorcinols